Andrew McDonald Peery (December 4, 1865 – June 5, 1906) was an American politician who served in the Virginia House of Delegates.

References

External links 

Members of the Virginia House of Delegates
19th-century American politicians